The Curtiss XF14C was an American naval fighter aircraft.  It was developed by Curtiss-Wright in response to a request by the United States Navy in 1941 to produce a new shipboard high-performance fighter aircraft.

Design and development
In 1941 the US Navy requested a better-performing carrier-based fighter plane, to be powered by the proposed high performance 24-cylinder liquid cooled Lycoming XH-2470 Hyper engine.  This was an unusual step for the Navy, which had been adamant to that time that all its aircraft use air-cooled radial engines.

On June 30, 1941 a contract for two prototype aircraft, designated the XF14C-1, was awarded to the Curtiss-Wright company. On the same date prototype development contracts were also awarded to Grumman Aircraft Engineering Corporation for the single-engine XF6F-1 and the twin engine XF7F-1, both of which would use air-cooled Pratt & Whitney R-2800 Double Wasp radial engines.

Early in the development the Navy requested better altitude performance and, in view of unsatisfactory progress in the development of the XH-2470 engine, Curtiss adapted the design of the aircraft around the new turbocharged Wright R-3350 Duplex-Cyclone air-cooled radial engine. The aircraft equipped with this eighteen-cylinder twin-row radial air-cooled engine and three bladed contra-rotating propellers was designated the XF14C-2. The XF14C-1 was canceled. Also, looking at the problems of operation at altitudes of about 40,000 feet (12,000 m), the Navy also initiated work on a third version with a pressurized cockpit designated the XF14C-3.

Ultimately, only the XF14C-2 prototype was completed, flying for the first time in July 1944. Moreover, disappointment with performance estimates and delays with the availability of the XR-3350-16 engine coupled with the evaporating tactical need for an extremely high-altitude fighter led to cancellation of the development.

Specifications (XF14C-2)

See also

References

Notes

Bibliography

 Bowers, Peter M. Curtiss Aircraft, 1907–1947. London, UK: Putnam & Company Ltd., 1979. .
 Green, William. War Planes of the Second World War - Fighters, vol. 4. London, UK: MacDonald, 1961. .
 Green, William and Swanborough, Gordon. WW2 Aircraft Fact Files: US Navy and marine Corps Fighters. London, UK: Macdonald and Jane's Publishers Ltd., 1976. .

Curtiss FC14
Low-wing aircraft
Single-engined tractor aircraft
F14C
Aircraft with contra-rotating propellers
Aircraft first flown in 1944